The Guajará River is a tributary of the Amazon River in the state of Pará, Brazil.

The river runs through the  Verde para Sempre Extractive Reserve, a sustainable use conservation unit created in 2004, before discharging into the Amazon.

See also
List of rivers of Pará

References

Rivers of Pará
Tributaries of the Amazon River